= Laurence A. Moran =

Canadian biochemist

Laurence "Larry" A. Moran is a Canadian biochemist and professor emeritus at the University of Toronto. He is co-author of multiple editions of the textbook Principles of Biochemistry and the book What's In Your Genome? 90% of Your Genome Is Junk. Moran received a PhD from Princeton University.

== Selected publications ==
- Principles of Biochemistry (multiple editions)
- What's In Your Genome? 90% of Your Genome Is Junk (2023)
